Allan James "Jim" Baker (22 July 1922 – 3 March 2017), usually cited as A. J. Baker, was an Australian philosopher who was best known for having systematised the realist philosophy of John Anderson. He studied under Anderson at Sydney University and had taught philosophy in Scotland, New Zealand, the United States, and Australia. He was a prominent member of the Sydney Libertarians and the Sydney Push. He instigated, and was a prolific contributor to, several journals, compilations and newsletters that addressed issues, philosophical and otherwise, associated with Sydney Libertarianism. Among these were Libertarian (1957–1960), Broadsheet (1960–1979), The Sydney Line: A Selection of Comments and Criticisms (1963), Heraclitus (1980–2006) and The Sydney Realist (2005–). In 1997 he published a monograph, Social Pluralism: A Realistic Analysis, in which he posited his exposition of human social life.

Bibliography
 Anderson's Social Philosophy: The Social Thought and Political Life of Professor John Anderson, Sydney: Angus and Robertson (1979)
 Australian Realism: The Systematic Philosophy of John Anderson, Cambridge University Press (1986)
 Social Pluralism: A Realistic Analysis, Wild and Woolley, Glebe NSW (1997).

References

1922 births
2017 deaths
20th-century atheists
20th-century Australian male writers
20th-century Australian philosophers
20th-century educators
20th-century essayists
21st-century atheists
21st-century Australian male writers
21st-century Australian philosophers
21st-century educators
21st-century essayists
Analytic philosophers
Atheist philosophers
Australian atheists
Australian essayists
Australian libertarians
Australian male non-fiction writers
Australian social commentators
Australian sociologists
Epistemologists
Metaphysicians
Ontologists
Philosophers of culture
Philosophers of education
Philosophers of social science
Philosophy writers
Social philosophers
University of Sydney alumni
Writers about activism and social change